was a Japanese politician who served as governor of Hiroshima Prefecture from January 1935 to April 1936. He was also governor of Toyama Prefecture (1931–1932), Kumamoto Prefecture (1932–1935) and Kyoto Prefecture (1936–1939).

Japanese Home Ministry government officials
Governors of Hiroshima
Governors of Kyoto
Governors of Kumamoto Prefecture
Governors of Toyama Prefecture
1889 births
1973 deaths